The 2009 FIBA Americas Championship, later known as the FIBA AmeriCup, was the continental championship held by FIBA Americas, for North, Central and South America and the Caribbean. This FIBA AmeriCup championship served as a qualifying tournament for the 2010 FIBA World Championship in Turkey. Each of the top four finishers in the quarterfinal round robin qualified for the World Championship.

Brazil won the gold medal, after beating host Puerto Rico, 61–60, in the title game. This was Brazil's fourth FIBA AmeriCup title, and second in the last three tournaments. At the time FIBA world number 1 ranked Argentina claimed the bronze medal, over fourth placed Canada. By making the quarterfinals, all four teams qualified for the 2010 FIBA World Championship. The tournament's leading scorer, Luis Scola, was named MVP of the tournament, after he rallied Argentina from an 0–2 start, to the bronze medal, by leading his team in scoring, in nine out of ten games.

Host 

The hosting privileges were originally awarded to Mexico but were later removed by FIBA Americas due to issues involving the sponsorship of the event. The other countries that already qualified were then informed by FIBA of the announcement, with Uruguay, Puerto Rico, Argentina and Canada all expressing interest of hosting the tournament.

On May 29, 2009, it was announced that Puerto Rico was selected as the new host of the championships, with the Roberto Clemente Coliseum in San Juan as the venue. Puerto Rico had previously hosted the 1980, 1993, 1999 and the 2003 Tournament of the Americas (prior to the tournament being renamed the FIBA Americas Championship.

Venues 
All games were played at Roberto Clemente Coliseum, which hosted games in each of Puerto Rico's previous four times hosting the FIBA Americas Championship. The 10,000-seat arena also hosted the final round of the 1974 FIBA World Championship after construction was completed in January 1973.

Qualification 

Qualification was done via FIBA Americas' sub-zones. The qualified teams are:
 South American Sub-Zone (2008 South American Basketball Championship):
 
 
 
 
 North America Sub-Zone:
 
 Central American and Caribbean Zone (2008 Centrobasket):
 
  withdrew.
 
 
 
 

The draw was done on June 9, at the Roberto Clemente Coliseum. Panama replaced Cuba after the latter withdrew.

The United States, which had qualified for the World Championship with a gold-medal performance in the 2008 Beijing Olympics, skipped this tournament, opening the slot for another team from the Centrobasket championship to qualify. Besides the United States, every participating nation from the FIBA Americas Championship 2007 qualified for this tournament, although Panama only returned by virtue of Cuba's withdrawal. The Dominican Republic returned to the tournament for the ninth time after failing to qualify in 2007.

Draw 
The draw ceremonies were held at San Juan on June 9, 2009. The results, with the FIBA World Rankings prior to the draw, were:
Note: Cuba had 0 ranking points and was therefore ranked after the last ranked team. However, once Cuba withdrew, Panama, ranked 30th, took Cuba's spot in Group B.

Format 
 The top four teams from each group advance to the quarterfinals.
 Results and standings among teams within the same group are carried over.
 The top four teams at the quarterfinals advance to the semifinals (1 vs. 4, 2 vs. 3). The top four also qualify outright to the 2010 FIBA World Championship.
 The winners in the knockout semifinals advance to the Final. The losers play for third place.

Tie-breaking criteria 
Ties are broken via the following the criteria, with the first option used first, all the way down to the last option:
 Head to head results
 Goal average (not the goal difference) between the tied teams
 Goal average of the tied teams for all teams in its group

Squads 

Each team had a roster of twelve players. Seven players currently on NBA rosters played in the tournament. The Dominican Republic led the way with three: Francisco Garcia, Al Horford, and Charlie Villanueva. Brazil (Anderson Varejão, Leandro Barbosa), Canada (Joel Anthony), and Argentina (Luis Scola) also called up NBA players to their rosters.

Preliminary round

Group A 
In Group A, hosts Puerto Rico stormed through to the quarterfinals undefeated, winning each game by double digits. On the fourth day of group play, surprising Uruguay stunned Canada, which had won its previous two games by a combined 75 points, for second place in the group after Martin Osimani hit a three with 21 seconds that gave the Uruguayans a 71–69 victory. Mexico dominated the second half against the Virgin Islands en route to a 17-point victory and the final quarterfinal spot out of Group A.

Group B 
Group B began with a shocker as Venezuela dominated world number one ranked Argentina, forcing 23 turnovers en route to a 16-point victory. Group winner Brazil was the only consistent team in the group, winning all of its games by at least nine points. The Dominican Republic, sporting a roster that included a tournament-high three NBA players, qualified to the quarterfinals with a 2–2 record. Argentina, buoyed by tournament scoring leader Luis Scola, rebounded from an 0–2 start to win its last two games and qualify for the next round. Venezuela could not capitalize on its victory over Argentina and was sent home after losing to Panama. The Venezuelans could have advanced on a tiebreaker had Argentina lost to the Dominicans, but Charlie Villanueva missed a three-pointer at the buzzer in overtime and Argentina escaped with an 89–87 victory in the final game of group play.

Quarterfinals 
In the quarterfinals, Brazil and Puerto Rico easily clinched a semifinal berth and qualification for the 2010 FIBA World Championship when both teams won their first two quarterfinal games to run their records to 5–0. World number one ranked Argentina also qualified, winning all four of their quarterfinal games to erase an 0–2 start and escape a nearly disastrous result. All three teams finished 6–1. Argentina handed Puerto Rico its first loss of the tournament, 80–78, when Pablo Prigioni hit two free throws with four seconds left in the game. Puerto Rico then handed the Brazilians their first loss in the tournament, after the Puerto Ricans took a 16-point fourth quarter lead and withstood a late charge to win by four. A tiebreaker gave Brazil the top seed in the semifinals.

Uruguay could not continue its momentum from its surprising 3–1 start, losing all four of its quarterfinal games. With Panama and Mexico already eliminated from semifinal contention, a Uruguay loss to Argentina on the final day of group play meant that the winner of the Canada-Dominican Republic game would advance to the semifinals and claim the final 2010 FIBA World Championship berth from the Americas. The Canadians slipped through with a four-point victory over a Dominican team that was playing without its star player, Francisco Garcia, after he broke a finger in quarterfinal play. Canada advanced to the World Championship despite a 1–4 start to the round after winning their last two quarterfinal games.

 Tiebreaker for tied teams is head-to-head results. Because Brazil, Puerto Rico, and Argentina split games against each other, the second tiebreaker, goal average for tied teams, was used.

Knockout round

Semi finals 
In the first semifinal, top seeded Brazil faced a surprising challenge from fourth seeded Canada. The Brazilians only led by one at halftime before blowing the game open in the second half, jumping out to a 17-point fourth quarter lead before the Canadians went on a late run to cut the final deficit to eight. In the second semifinal, Puerto Rico erased a nine-point deficit in a five-point victory over Argentina. The host team avenged a quarterfinal loss to the Argentine team despite Luis Scola's tournament-high 31 points.

Third place 
In the bronze medal match, Argentina never trailed while jumping out to a 31-point halftime lead. The over-matched Canadians could not cut the lead below double digits at any time after the first quarter.

Final 
Brazil claimed the gold medal over the host Puerto Ricans in a 61–60 thriller. The Brazilians took a 13-point lead into the fourth quarter and led by 11 with 5:45 left before the Puerto Ricans began a frantic run to get back in the game. After Carlos Arroyo hit a basket with 35 seconds left to pull the Puerto Ricans within two at 61–59, Puerto Rican youngster Angel Vassalo stole the ball and was fouled. After hitting the first, Vassalo missed the second free throw; the Puerto Ricans did get the ball back, but Carlos Arroyo missed a 3-pointer at the buzzer and Brazil hung on for a 61–60 victory to claim its fourth FIBA Americas Championship.

Awards

Statistical leaders

Individual Tournament Highs 

Points

Rebounds

Assists

Steals

Blocks

Minutes

Individual Game Highs

Team Tournament Highs 

Offensive PPG

Defensive PPG

Rebounds

Assists

Steals

Blocks

Team Game highs

Final standings

All-Tournament Teams 
The following players were voted to the All-Tournament Teams by latinbasket.com (unofficial):

First Team 
G –  Carlos Arroyo
G –  Leandro Barbosa
F –  Al Horford
F –  Luis Scola (Tournament MVP)
C –  Esteban Batista

Second Team 
G –  Pablo Prigioni
G –  Larry Ayuso
F –  Danilo Pinnock
F –  Charlie Villanueva
C –  Anderson Varejão

Third Team 
G –  Jermaine Anderson
G –  Leandro Garcia
F –  Hector Romero
F –  Joel Anthony
C –  Peter John Ramos

References

External links 
 Official site

 
FIBA AmeriCup
2009–10 in North American basketball
2009–10 in South American basketball
2009 in Puerto Rican sports
International basketball competitions hosted by Puerto Rico